Raymond Douglas Ogden was a former professional American football wide receiver. He played seven seasons for the St. Louis Cardinals (1965–1966), the New Orleans Saints (1967), the Atlanta Falcons (1967–1968), and the Chicago Bears (1969–1971) in the National Football League.

References

1942 births
Living people
People from Jesup, Georgia
American football wide receivers
Alabama Crimson Tide football players
St. Louis Cardinals (football) players
Atlanta Falcons players
New Orleans Saints players
Chicago Bears players
Players of American football from Georgia (U.S. state)